Private Account (April 26, 1976 – November 25, 2004) was an American Thoroughbred racehorse.

Background
Private Account was sired by Hall of Fame inductee Damascus, a son of another Hall of Fame horse, Sword Dancer. His dam was Numbered Account, the 1971 American Champion Two-Year-Old Filly and a daughter of yet another Hall of Fame inductee, Buckpasser. Private Account is a half-brother to Dance Number.

Racing career
Private Account's wins included the Grades 1 Gulfstream Park and Widener Handicaps under jockey Jeffrey Fell.

Stud record
Private Account was an outstanding sire whose progeny counts six millionaires including two Hall of Fame fillies, Personal Ensign and Inside Information.

References

1976 racehorse births
2004 racehorse deaths
Racehorses bred in Kentucky
Racehorses trained in the United States
American Grade 1 Stakes winners
Phipps family
Thoroughbred family 1-x